Ian Neven MacEwan (born 1 May 1934) is a former New Zealand rugby union player. A lock and number eight, MacEwan represented Wellington at a provincial level, and was a member of the New Zealand national side, the All Blacks, from 1956 to 1962. He played 52 matches for the All Blacks including 20 internationals. He captained the All Blacks in three tour matches, against Northern Transvaal and Eastern Province in 1960, and Newcastle in 1962.

MacEwan was educated at Nelson College from 1949 to 1952, and played in the school's 1st XV in 1951 and 1952.

MacEwan released his autobiography entitled When the Crowd Stops Roaring in 2019. In this book he described his struggles with alcoholism, leading to a theft conviction and suicide attempt in 1979, and his later recovery.

References

1934 births
Living people
People educated at Nelson College
New Zealand rugby union players
New Zealand international rugby union players
Rugby union players from Auckland
Wellington rugby union players
Rugby union locks
Rugby union number eights